Florentinus Ludovicus Leopoldus Eduard ("Flor") Van Noppen (28 June 1956 – 22 September 2014) was a Belgian politician who was affiliated with the N-VA.

Van Noppen was the brother of veterinarian Karel Van Noppen, who was the victim in a high-profile murder case. He was elected as a member of the Belgian Chamber of Representatives in 2007 and reelected in 2010. He served as city councilor (2001-2014) and alderman (2007-13) of Dessel.

Death
Van Noppen, who suffered from Multiple system atrophy, retired from politics after the 2014 elections upon completing his term. He died on 22 September 2014, aged 58.

Notes

1956 births
2014 deaths
Members of the Chamber of Representatives (Belgium)
New Flemish Alliance politicians
People from Turnhout
Neurological disease deaths in Belgium
Deaths from multiple system atrophy
21st-century Belgian politicians